The Taep'oong International Investment Group of Korea is a Pyongyang-based North Korean company established by the National Defence Commission of North Korea. It officially manages the oversea investments to North Korea. Three of the seven members of board of directors were Kim Jong-il's personal financial managers.

Activities
Pak Chŏlsu, the head representative of Taep'oong provided 10 investors from Hong Kong a tour to the Kaesong Industrial Region in May 2010.
Despite the ongoing tension, the Taep'oong has proposed a co-operative solution to the remaining assets of South Korean Hyundai's Mount Kumgang Tourist Region in North Korean territories.

References

Financial services companies of North Korea
Government-owned companies of North Korea